Sir John Honywood, 4th Baronet (?1757–1806), of Evington, Kent, was an English politician.

He was the eldest son of William Honywood and the grandson of Sir John Honywood 3rd Bt., from whom he inherited the baronetcy in 1781.

He was a Member of Parliament (MP) for Steyning in 1784 – July 1785 and 17 Apr. 1788 – 1790; for Canterbury in 1790–1796 and 10 Mar. 1797 – 1802 and for Honiton in 1802 – 29 Mar. 1806.

He died in 1806. He had married Frances, the daughter of William Courtenay, 2nd Viscount Courtenay, with whom he had a son and 6 daughters. He was succeeded by his son, Sir John Courtenay Honywood, 5th Baronet.

References

1757 births
1806 deaths
Baronets in the Baronetage of England
People from Folkestone and Hythe District
Members of the Parliament of Great Britain for English constituencies
British MPs 1784–1790
British MPs 1790–1796
British MPs 1796–1800
Members of the Parliament of the United Kingdom for Honiton
UK MPs 1801–1802
UK MPs 1802–1806